Diaphorocetus is an extinct genus of odontocete cetacean belonging to Physeteroidea. Its remains were found in the Monte León Formation of Argentina, dating to the Early Miocene.

Systematics
Diaphorocetus was originally named Mesocetus by Moreno (1892). Lydekker (1893) found that Mesocetus was already in use for an extinct mysticete, so he renamed the sperm whale Hypocetus. Ameghino (1894) too recognized Moreno's name as preoccupied, but unaware of Lydekker's paper, coined his own replacement name Diaphorocetus for Mesocetus. Diaphorocetus was declared a nomen protectum (protected name) by Paolucci et al. (2019) because Hypocetus and Paracetus have not been used as valid since 1899 under Article 23.9 of the Code.

Paleoecology
The small teeth of Diaphorocetus and the bottleneck-like nature of the rostrum suggest that Diaphorocetus employed a feeding strategy intermediate between that of raptorial sperm whales like Acrophyseter and Livyatan and extant sperm whales.

References 

Sperm whales
Prehistoric toothed whales
Prehistoric cetacean genera
Miocene mammals of South America
Colhuehuapian
Deseadan
Neogene Argentina
Fossils of Argentina
Fossil taxa described in 1894
Taxa named by Florentino Ameghino